Long Cane may refer to:  

 Long Cane, Georgia 
 Long Cane Massacre Site, in South Carolina